Dejan Georgijević (Serbian Cyrillic: Дејан Георгијевић; born 19 January 1994) is a Serbian professional footballer who plays as a striker for Công An Hà Nội.

Career statistics

Honours
Partizan
Serbian Cup: 2018–19

References

External links
Srbijafudbal profile

1994 births
Living people
Footballers from Belgrade
Association football forwards
Serbian footballers
FK Zemun players
FK Teleoptik players
FK Spartak Subotica players
FK Inđija players
FK Voždovac players
Ferencvárosi TC footballers
FK Partizan players
FC Irtysh Pavlodar players
FK Velež Mostar players
NK Domžale players
Simba S.C. players
Serbian First League players
Serbian SuperLiga players
Nemzeti Bajnokság I players
Kazakhstan Premier League players
Premier League of Bosnia and Herzegovina players
Slovenian PrvaLiga players
Tanzanian Premier League players

Serbian expatriate footballers
Expatriate footballers in Hungary
Serbian expatriate sportspeople in Hungary
Expatriate footballers in Kazakhstan
Serbian expatriate sportspeople in Kazakhstan
Expatriate footballers in Bosnia and Herzegovina
Serbian expatriate sportspeople in Bosnia and Herzegovina
Expatriate footballers in Slovenia
Serbian expatriate sportspeople in Slovenia
Expatriate footballers in Tanzania
Serbian expatriate sportspeople in Tanzania
Expatriate footballers in Vietnam
Serbian expatriate sportspeople in Vietnam